Yogender Chandolia is an Indian politician. He was the standing committee chairperson of the Municipal Corporation of Delhi (MCD). He was also a Municipal Councilor for Dev Nagar, Karol Bagh Zone, Delhi. He has been active in politics since his college days and has been elected as the Municipal Councillor several times. He belongs to the (BJP). He was the first from the Regar community to make it to the post of Chairman of the Standing Committee, MCD, and the first politician from Karol Bagh to make a hat-trick in the election.

References

Year of birth missing (living people)
Living people
Delhi politicians
People from Central Delhi district
Bharatiya Janata Party politicians from Delhi
People from Karol Bagh